Municipal bond arbitrage, also called municipal bond relative value arbitrage, municipal arbitrage, or just muni arb, generally consists of building a leveraged portfolio of high-quality, tax-exempt municipal bonds and simultaneously hedging the duration risk in that municipal bond portfolio by shorting the equivalent taxable corporate bonds. These corporate equivalents are typically interest rate swaps referencing Libor or BMA (short for Bond Market Association). Muni arb is a relative value strategy that seizes upon an inefficiency that is related to government tax policy; interest on municipal bonds is exempt from federal income tax. Because the source of this arbitrage is artificially imposed by government regulation, it has persisted (i.e., it has not been "arbed away") for decades.

The arbitrage manifests itself in the form of a relatively cheap longer maturity municipal bond, which is a municipal bond that yields significantly more than 65% of a corresponding taxable corporate bond. The steeper slope of the municipal yield curve allows participants to collect more after-tax income from the municipal bond portfolio than is spent on the interest rate swap; the carry is greater than the hedge expense. Positive, tax-free carry can reach into the double digits.

The bet in municipal bond arbitrage is that, over a longer period of time, two similar instruments--municipal bonds and interest rate swaps--will correlate with each other; they are both very high quality credits, have the same maturity and are denominated in U.S. dollars. Credit risk and duration risk are largely eliminated in this strategy. However, basis risk arises from use of an imperfect hedge, which results in significant, but range-bound principal volatility. The end goal is to limit this principal volatility, eliminating its relevance over time as the high, consistent, tax-free cash flow accumulates.

Arbitrage
Financial markets
Local government finance